The Electoral district of Talbot, Dalhousie and Angelsey was one of the original sixteen electoral districts of the old unicameral Victorian Legislative Council of 1851 to 1856. Victoria being a colony in Australia at the time.

The district's area was defined as consisting of the three central western Victorian counties of Talbot, Dalhousie and Angelsey.

From 1856 onwards, the Victorian parliament consisted of two houses, the Victorian Legislative Council (upper house, consisting of Provinces) and the Victorian Legislative Assembly (lower house).

Members
One member initially, two from the expansion of the Council in 1853.

Fawkner went on to represent Central Province in the Victorian Legislative Council from November 1856.
Mollison went on to represent Dundas and Follett in the Victorian Legislative Assembly from April 1858.

See also
 Parliaments of the Australian states and territories
 List of members of the Victorian Legislative Council

External links

(same boundaries as defined in 1851)

References

Former electoral districts of Victorian Legislative Council
1851 establishments in Australia
1856 disestablishments in Australia